("Entertainment Imagination and Magnificence" ) was a Japanese game development company established in 1989 by programmer/musician Kenji Eno, who later started Warp.

Games
Casino Kid 2 (music/sound only) (NES)
Juuouki (Famicom)
Kyouryuu Densetsu (unreleased) (Famicom)
Miyasu Nonki no Quiz 18-kin (Arcade)
Parallel World (Famicom)
SD Hero Soukessen: Taose! Aku no Gundan (Famicom)
Superman / Sunman (unreleased) (NES)
Time Zone (Famicom)
Wanpaku Kokkun no Gourmet World / Panic Restaurant (Famicom/NES)

See also
Kenji Eno

External links
SIT Developer Table entry on Kenji Eno
SIT Developer Table entry on EIM Group
EIM Group programmer Hirofumi Hayashida's employment history summary

Video game companies established in 1989
Defunct video game companies of Japan